Matthews may refer to:

People
 Matthews (surname)

Places
 Matthews Island, Antarctica
 Matthews Range, Kenya
 Mount Matthews, New Zealand

United States
 Matthews, Georgia
 Matthews, Indiana
 Matthews, Maryland
 Matthews, Missouri
 Matthews, New Jersey
 Matthews, North Carolina
 Matthews, Texas
 St. Matthews, Kentucky
 Camp Calvin B. Matthews, former US Marine Corps rifle range

Other uses
 Matthews (film), a 2017 documentary film about British footballer Sir Stanley Matthews

See also
 Mathews (disambiguation)
 Matthew (disambiguation)
 Justice Matthews (disambiguation)